Dynamite Joe is a 1966 Italian western film directed by Anthony Dawson, written by María del Carmen Martínez Román, and scored by Carlo Savina.

Cast

References

External links
 

1966 Western (genre) films
Spaghetti Western films
Films directed by Antonio Margheriti
Films scored by Carlo Savina
Films shot in Almería
1960s Italian films